O', O’, O`, O´, O‘ or Oʻ may refer to:

 the anglicized variant of the patronymic term "Ó" in Irish names (like in O'Sullivan)
 short for "of" or "on" (like in Pot o' Gold, John o' Groats or o'clock)
 a misspelling of the letter "O" with a diacritic like Ó, Ò, or Ơ.
 Oʻ, the twenty-fifth letter of the Uzbek alphabet
O′ (with prime symbol) represents the glottalized or creaky vowel "/o̰/" in Taa language
’O or ’o is a male article in Neapolitan language (like in ’O sole mio)

See also 
 ’ (apostrophe)
 ` (grave accent)
 ´ (acute accent)
 ‘ (quotation mark)
 ′ (prime symbol)
 
 
 
 
 
 
 
 O (disambiguation)